Putumayo Canton is a canton of Ecuador, located in the Sucumbíos Province.  Its capital is the town of Puerto El Carmen de Putumayo.  Its population at the 2001 census was 6,171.

Places of interest 
 Cuyabeno Wildlife Reserve

References

Cantons of Sucumbíos Province